The discography of English alternative rock band Queenadreena consists of four studio albums, seven singles, and one compilation album. Formed in London by former Daisy Chainsaw members KatieJane Garside and Crispin Gray, Queenadreena released their debut album, Taxidermy, in 2000 on Blanco y Negro Records. Their following album, Drink Me (2002), was released on Rough Trade before the group signed with One Little Indian, who released their third studio album, The Butcher and the Butterfly (2005).

They released a live album, Live at the ICA, which contains a performance supporting The Butcher and the Butterfly, before independently releasing a series of demo tracks on the compilation album Ride a Cock Horse (2007). Their final album was Djin (2008), released by Imperial Records.

Studio albums

Compilation albums

Live albums

Singles

Music videos 
 "Cold Fish" (1999)
 "Jolene" (2000)
 "I Adore You" (2000)
 "Pretty Like Drugs" (2002)
 "FM Doll" [Original Version] (2002)
 "Medicine Jar" (2005) (3 versions)
 "Lick" (2009)

Home videos

References

Discographies of British artists
Punk rock group discographies
Rock music group discographies